Bruges-la-Morte (French; The Dead [City of] Bruges) is a short novel by the Belgian author Georges Rodenbach, first published in 1892. The novel is notable for two reasons:  it was the archetypal Symbolist novel, and was the first work of fiction illustrated with photographs.

A translation by Thomas Duncan was published by Atlas Press in London in 1993. 

A new English translation of Bruges-la-Morte, by Will Stone and Mike Mitchell, appeared in 2005, published by Dedalus Books and with an introduction by Alan Hollinghurst.

Plot

It tells the story of Hugues Viane, a widower overcome with grief, who takes refuge in Bruges, where he lives among the relics of his former wife - her clothes, her letters, a length of her hair - rarely leaving his house. However he becomes obsessed with a dancer he sees at the opera Robert le diable who bears a likeness to his dead wife. He courts her but in time he comes to see she is very different, coarser, and their relationship ends in tragedy.

Literary history
Bruges-la-Morte is a Symbolist novel, perhaps the Symbolist novel, according to critic James Gardner. The book is notable for its poetic evocation of the decaying city and for its innovative form. It is very modern (as in modernism) in the sense that nothing much happens. It falls within the camp of realist symbolism.

Rodenbach interspersed his text with dozens of black-and-white photographs of Bruges. It is believed to be the first work of fiction illustrated with photographs. The novel includes 35 pictures in total. The only current French edition that features the original pictures is the GF Flammarion edition edited by Jean-Pierre Bertrand and Daniel Grojnowski, which was published in 1998, on the centenary of Rodenbach's death. The English translation by Will Stone and Mike Mitchell, published by Dedalus Press, includes a series of modern photographs instead of the originals.

Adaptions and influences

In 1915 Russian director Yevgeni Bauer adapted the novel for the screen. It was renamed 'Daydreams', the action was moved from Bruges to contemporary Moscow and characters' names were changed but otherwise the film is faithful to the book.

In 1920 the composer Erich Wolfgang Korngold used the novel as the basis for his opera Die tote Stadt. The 1956 Argentine film Beyond Oblivion directed by Hugo del Carril is loosely based on the novel.

In 1980 the French film director  adapted the novel as Bruges la morte.

In 1981 the Flemish film director Roland Verhavert adapted the novel as "Brugge, die stille".

The novel influenced many later writers, including W.G. Sebald. The plot of the book may also have influenced the French crime novel D'entre les morts by Boileau-Narcejac, which was filmed by Alfred Hitchcock as Vertigo in 1958.

References

External links

Bruges-la-Morte at Internet Archive (scanned books and audiobooks)
 

Bruges in fiction
1892 Belgian novels
Novels set in Belgium
Symbolist novels
Novels about cities
French-language novels
Works set in opera houses